Hetaeria oblongifolia, commonly known as the hairy jewel orchid, is a species of orchid that is native to Southeast Asia, New Guinea and Queensland. It has between four and eight egg-shaped, dark green leaves and up to forty five small, hairy green and white flowers with a deep pouch near the base of the labellum.

Description
Flowering occurs from July to October.

Taxonomy and naming
Hetaeria oblongifolia was first formally described in 1825 by Carl Ludwig Blume and the description was published in Bijdragen tot de Flora van Nederlandsch Indie. The specific epithet (oblongifolia) is derived from the Latin words oblongus meaning "elongated" and folium meaning "leaf".

Distribution and habitat
The hairy jewel orchid usually grows on sheltered slopes in rainforest and near streams. It is found in Indonesia, Malaysia, New Guinea, New Caledonia, the Philippines, the Solomon Islands, Thailand, Vanuatu and in Queensland between the Kutini-Payamu National Park and Rockhampton.

Gallery

References

External links 
 

Orchids of Queensland
Orchids of Indonesia
Orchids of the Philippines
Orchids of New Guinea
Orchids of New Caledonia
Orchids of the Solomon Islands
Orchids of Thailand
Orchids of Vanuatu
Plants described in 1825
oblongifolia